Watson Mill Bridge State Park is a  Georgia state park located near Comer and Carlton on the South Fork of the Broad River. The site is listed on the National Register of Historic Places as the Watson Mill Covered Bridge and Mill Historic District. The bridge, built in 1885, is supported by a Town lattice truss system held together with wooden pegs also known as trunnels. Georgia once had over 200 covered bridges, but only 20 now remain. The park also offers a scenic nature trail and a new hiking/riding trail that winds through the thick forests and along the rivers edge.

Facilities
21 tent/trailer/RV sites
3 pioneer camping sites
Group shelter
3 picnic shelters
Boat rental

See also
List of bridges on the National Register of Historic Places in Georgia
List of bridges documented by the Historic American Engineering Record in Georgia (U.S. state)
List of covered bridges in Georgia (U.S. state)

References

External links

Watson Mill Covered Bridge State Park

State parks of Georgia (U.S. state)
IUCN Category V
Historic American Engineering Record in Georgia (U.S. state)
Historic districts on the National Register of Historic Places in Georgia (U.S. state)
Protected areas established in 1991
Protected areas of Madison County, Georgia
1991 establishments in Georgia (U.S. state)
National Register of Historic Places in Madison County, Georgia
Covered bridges on the National Register of Historic Places in Georgia (U.S. state)
Agricultural buildings and structures on the National Register of Historic Places in Georgia (U.S. state)
Road bridges on the National Register of Historic Places in Georgia (U.S. state)
Wooden bridges in Georgia (U.S. state)
Lattice truss bridges in the United States
Buildings and structures in Madison County, Georgia